This is a list of free and open-source software for geological data handling and interpretation. The list is split into broad categories, depending on the intended use of the software and its scope of functionality.

Notice that 'free and open-source' requires that the source code is available and users are given a free software license. Simple being 'free of charge' is not sufficient—see gratis versus libre.

Well logging & Borehole visualisation

Geosciences software platforms

Geostatistics

Forward modeling

Geomodeling

Visualization, interpretation & analysis packages

Geographic information systems (GIS)

This important class of tools is already listed in the article List of GIS software.

Not true free and open-source projects

The following projects have unknown licensing, licenses or other conditions which place some restriction on use or redistribution, or which depend on non-open-source software like MATLAB or XVT (and therefore do not meet the Open Source Definition from the Open Source Initiative).

References

Free software
Geology
Free
Lists of software